Clay is an unincorporated community and census-designated place (CDP) in Burleson County, Texas, United States. It was first listed as a CDP prior to the 2020 census and has a population of 139.

The Snook Independent School District has served Clay since 1949.

References 

Bryan–College Station
Populated places in Burleson County, Texas
Census-designated places in Burleson County, Texas
Census-designated places in Texas